Hebert Abimorad (born 1946 in Montevideo) is a Uruguayan-born journalist, translator and poet.

Abimorad went into exile to Sweden due to the civic-military dictatorship in Uruguay. He settled in Gothemburg and developed a journalist career, writing for Göteborgs-Posten and Arbetet. He also wrote poetry and translated Swedish works into Spanish.

Works
His works are:
Gotemburgo, amor y destino (bilingual, 1982)
Gestos distantes (bilingual, 1985)
Voces ecos (bilingual, 1988)
Poemas Frugálicos (1994)
Poemas frugálicos 2 (1995)
Malena y Cíber (Ediciones Trilce, Montevideo, 1996; under the heteronym Martina Martínez) 
Poemas Frugálicos 3 (Ediciones Trilce, Montevideo, 1998, compilation of previous writings) 
Conversaciones y Volverá la loba... (Ediciones Trilce, Montevideo, 2000, under the heteronyms José José and Camilo Alegre)
Nuevos poemas frugálicos y otros textos heterónimos- Antología 1982-2007 (Baile del sol, Spain, 2008)
Hermatario (Botella al mar, 2011, Montevideo, under the heteronym Silvestre del Bosque)
Invento ad Gotemburgum (La Torre degli Arabeschi, Italy, 2001)
 Mekong (Aedas, Montevideo, 2012, illustrations by Sandra Petrovich)
 dios (Yaugurú, Montevideo, 2013, under the heteronym Flor de Condominio)
100 poemas frugálicos (Ediciones Oblicuas, Spain, 2014)
Poemas y dibujos frugálicos (Yaugurú, Montevideo, 2015)
  La Plaza ( Vitruvio, Madrid, 2018) 
  Profecías frugálicas ( Vitruvio, Madrid, 2020)
 Frugálicas variaciones estacionales ( Madrid 2022)

In Swedish
Korta dikter (Heterogénesis, 2000, translation by Lena E. Heyman)
Samtal (Libertad, Suecia, 2006, translation by Lena E. Heyman)
  Mekong ( Styx, Suecia, 2018, translation by Maria Nääs)
 Torget ( Styx, Suecia, translation by Siri Hultén, 2020 )
In French
Poémes frugaux-Poemas frugálicos (Fondation littéraire Fleur de Lys, Canada, 2010, translation by Marie-C Seguin)
In Italian
Nuove poesie frugali ed altri testi eteronimi ( Liberaij, Edizione privata, 2017, translation by Karen Hofling, Italia)
Translations
Barn kammare (The Children's Room) for Atelier teater, Gothemburg (1984)
Poesía sueca contemporánea (Baile del sol, Spain, 2011)
Edith Södergran, Karin Boye, un encuentro entre dos poetas suecas ( Ediciones oblicuas, 2017, Spain)
 "Un encuentro con tres poetas suecas, Edith Södergran, Karin Boye, Agnes von Krusenstjerna (Editorial Yaugurú, Montevideo)

References

External links 
 / Sitio web de Hebert Abimorad 
 Hebert Abimorad - Uruguay Cultural 

1946 births
Living people
People from Montevideo
Uruguayan people of Arab descent
Uruguayan exiles
Uruguayan expatriates in Sweden
Uruguayan male poets
Uruguayan journalists
Uruguayan translators
Swedish–Spanish translators